The International Convention on Load Lines (CLL), was signed in London on 5 April 1966, amended by the 1988 Protocol and further revised in 2003.  The convention pertains specifically to a ship's load line (also referred to as the "waterline"), a marking of the highest point on a ship's hull that can safely meet the surface of the water; a ship that is loaded to the point where its load line is underwater and no longer visible has exceeded its draft and is in danger because its capacity has been exceeded.

The 1988 Protocol was adopted to harmonise the survey and certification requirement of the 1966 Convention with those contained in the International Convention for the Safety of Life at Sea (SOLAS) and MARPOL 73/78.

In accordance with the International Convention on Load Lines (CLL 66/88), all assigned load lines must be marked amidships on each side of the ships engaged in international voyages. The determinations of the freeboard of ships are calculated and/or verified by classification societies which issue International Load Line Certificates in accordance with the legislation of participating States.

Provisions 
The Convention provides for the terms of ship's surveys, issuance, duration, validity and acceptance of International Load Line Certificates, as well as relevant State control measures, agreed exemptions and exceptions.

Annexes to the Convention contain various regulations for determining load lines, including details of marking and verification of marks, conditions of assignment of freeboard, freeboard tables and corrections, special provisions for ships intended for the carriage of timber and the prescribed form of International Load Line Certificates.

According to the Annexes to the convention, also taken into account are the potential hazards present in different zones and different seasons and additional safety measures concerning doors, hatchways, etc.

References

External links
 International Maritime Organization on CLL 66/88 –  
 IACS 
 The basic Concept of Load Lines

Admiralty law treaties
International Maritime Organization treaties
Maritime safety
Water transport
International water transport
Treaties concluded in 1966
Treaties of Albania
Treaties of Algeria
Treaties of the People's Republic of Angola
Treaties of Antigua and Barbuda
Treaties of Argentina
Treaties of Australia
Treaties of Austria
Treaties of Azerbaijan
Treaties of the Bahamas
Treaties of Bahrain
Treaties of Bangladesh
Treaties of Barbados
Treaties of Belarus
Treaties of Belgium
Treaties of Belize
Treaties of the People's Republic of Benin
Treaties of Bolivia
Treaties of the military dictatorship in Brazil
Treaties of Brunei
Treaties of the People's Republic of Bulgaria
Treaties of Myanmar
Treaties of Cambodia
Treaties of Cameroon
Treaties of Canada
Treaties of Cape Verde
Treaties of Chile
Treaties of the People's Republic of China
Treaties of Colombia
Treaties of the Comoros
Treaties of the Democratic Republic of the Congo (1964–1971)
Treaties of the Republic of the Congo
Treaties of the Cook Islands
Treaties of Ivory Coast
Treaties of Croatia
Treaties of Cuba
Treaties of Cyprus
Treaties of the Czech Republic
Treaties of Czechoslovakia
Treaties of Denmark
Treaties of Djibouti
Treaties of Dominica
Treaties of the Dominican Republic
Treaties of Ecuador
Treaties of Egypt
Treaties of Equatorial Guinea
Treaties of Eritrea
Treaties of Estonia
Treaties of the Derg
Treaties of Fiji
Treaties of Finland
Treaties of France
Treaties of Gabon
Treaties of the Gambia
Treaties of Georgia (country)
Treaties of East Germany
Treaties of West Germany
Treaties of Ghana
Treaties of Greece
Treaties of Grenada
Treaties of Guatemala
Treaties of Guinea
Treaties of Guyana
Treaties of Haiti
Treaties of Honduras
Treaties of the Hungarian People's Republic
Treaties of Iceland
Treaties of India
Treaties of Indonesia
Treaties of Pahlavi Iran
Treaties of Ireland
Treaties of Israel
Treaties of Italy
Treaties of Jamaica
Treaties of Japan
Treaties of Jordan
Treaties of Kazakhstan
Treaties of Kenya
Treaties of Kiribati
Treaties of North Korea
Treaties of South Korea
Treaties of Kuwait
Treaties of Latvia
Treaties of Lebanon
Treaties of Liberia
Treaties of the Libyan Arab Republic
Treaties of Lithuania
Treaties of Luxembourg
Treaties of Madagascar
Treaties of Malawi
Treaties of Malaysia
Treaties of the Maldives
Treaties of Malta
Treaties of the Marshall Islands
Treaties of Mauritania
Treaties of Mauritius
Treaties of Mexico
Treaties of Moldova
Treaties of Monaco
Treaties of Mongolia
Treaties of Montenegro
Treaties of Morocco
Treaties of Mozambique
Treaties of Namibia
Treaties of the Netherlands
Treaties of New Zealand
Treaties of Nicaragua
Treaties of Nigeria
Treaties of Niue
Treaties of Norway
Treaties of Oman
Treaties of Pakistan
Treaties of Palau
Treaties of Panama
Treaties of Papua New Guinea
Treaties of Peru
Treaties of the Philippines
Treaties of the Polish People's Republic
Treaties of the Estado Novo (Portugal)
Treaties of Qatar
Treaties of the Socialist Republic of Romania
Treaties of Saint Kitts and Nevis
Treaties of Saint Lucia
Treaties of Saint Vincent and the Grenadines
Treaties of Samoa
Treaties of São Tomé and Príncipe
Treaties of Saudi Arabia
Treaties of Senegal
Treaties of Serbia and Montenegro
Treaties of Seychelles
Treaties of Sierra Leone
Treaties of Singapore
Treaties of Slovakia
Treaties of Slovenia
Treaties of the Solomon Islands
Treaties of the Somali Republic
Treaties of South Africa
Treaties of the Soviet Union
Treaties of Francoist Spain
Treaties of Sri Lanka
Treaties of the Republic of the Sudan (1985–2011)
Treaties of Suriname
Treaties of Sweden
Treaties of Switzerland
Treaties of Syria
Treaties of Tanzania
Treaties of Thailand
Treaties of Togo
Treaties of Tonga
Treaties of Trinidad and Tobago
Treaties of Tunisia
Treaties of Turkey
Treaties of Turkmenistan
Treaties of Tuvalu
Treaties of Ukraine
Treaties of the United Arab Emirates
Treaties of the United Kingdom
Treaties of the United States
Treaties of Uruguay
Treaties of Vanuatu
Treaties of Venezuela
Treaties of Vietnam
Treaties of South Vietnam
Treaties of the Yemen Arab Republic
Treaties of South Yemen
Treaties of Yugoslavia
Treaties of Zambia
1966 in London
Treaties entered into force in 1968
Treaties extended to the Netherlands Antilles
Treaties extended to Bermuda
Treaties extended to the Isle of Man
Treaties extended to Gibraltar
Treaties extended to Jersey
Treaties extended to the Falkland Islands
Treaties extended to the British Virgin Islands
Treaties extended to the Turks and Caicos Islands
Treaties extended to Saint Helena, Ascension and Tristan da Cunha
Treaties extended to Puerto Rico
Treaties extended to Guam
Treaties extended to the United States Virgin Islands
Treaties extended to American Samoa
Treaties extended to Midway Atoll
Treaties extended to Wake Island
Treaties extended to Johnston Atoll
Treaties extended to the Trust Territory of the Pacific Islands
Treaties extended to Aruba
Treaties extended to the Faroe Islands
Treaties extended to Greenland
Treaties extended to Surinam (Dutch colony)
Treaties extended to Portuguese Macau
Treaties extended to British Hong Kong
Treaties extended to the Panama Canal Zone